Anson Black Cornell (March 20, 1890 – November 7, 1975) was an American college football player and coach and college athletics administrator. He served as the head football coach at the College of Idaho from 1917 to 1932 and at the Pacific University in Forest Grove, Oregon from 1933 to 1935.<

Head coaching record

References

External links
 

1890 births
1975 deaths
College of Idaho Coyotes football coaches
Oregon Ducks athletic directors
Oregon Ducks football players
Pacific Boxers athletic directors
Pacific Boxers football coaches
Sportspeople from Eugene, Oregon
Players of American football from Oregon